The 2023 NWSL Challenge Cup, known as the 2023 UKG NWSL Challenge Cup for sponsorship reasons, is a league cup competition that will take place during the 2023 National Women's Soccer League season. It will be the fourth edition of the NWSL Challenge Cup tournament.

The 2023 NWSL Challenge Cup will be the first time the NWSL Challenge Cup is played concurrently with the regular season, bringing it in line with most other league cup competitions worldwide. It will also be the first edition under a multi-year sponsorship with UKG, which has pledged to increase the prize money for winning the tournament to bring pay parity compared to men's league and open cup competitions in the United States.

Format 
The 2023 NWSL Challenge Cup will be a multi-stage tournament. All 12 NWSL teams will participate in the Challenge Cup, and the tournament will be played concurrently with the regular season. The tournament was split into three groups of four teams each, and each team will play a six-game double round-robin with its group. Following the group stage, four teams will progress to single-elimination semifinals on September 6 and the final on September 9.

Group stage

East Division

Central Division

West Division

Ranking of second-placed teams 
The best second-placed team from the group stage advanced to the knockout stage.

Knockout stage

Bracket

Statistics

Goalscorers

Discipline

Awards

References

External links 

2023
2023 in American soccer leagues
2023 National Women's Soccer League season
NWSL